Ilya Gorodnichev (born 9 March 1987 in Moscow) is a Russian former professional cyclist.

Major results

2009
 2nd Gran Premio Inda
 2nd Trofeo Internazionale Bastianelli
 3rd Gara Ciclistica Montappone
 9th Ruota d'Oro
2010
 1st Gara Ciclistica Montappone
 5th Trofeo Alcide Degasperi
 7th GP Capodarco
 10th Coppa della Pace
2011
 4th Trofeo Alcide Degasperi
 9th Overall Giro del Friuli-Venezia Giulia
2012
 1st Gran Premio San Giuseppe
 10th Overall Giro del Friuli-Venezia Giulia
2014
 6th Overall Tour of Kavkaz
2015
 2nd Overall Tour de Kumano

References

External links

1987 births
Living people
Russian male cyclists
Cyclists from Moscow